Francišak Bahuševič (– was a Belarusian poet, writer and lawyer, considered to be one of the initiators of modern Belarusian literature.

Biography
Bahuševič was born in Ambary Manor in the Vilna uezd of the Vilna Governorate (now in Vilnius District Municipality, Lithuania). As known, this manor in the end life was got by Vasily Tyapinsky. Bahuševič participated in the January Uprising of 1863-1864. After this, Bahuševič left Belarus to live in Ukraine, where he studied in Nezhin law school. He worked as a lawyer defending the rights of the peasantry. After amnesty for all participants of the revolt was announced, dated for an ascension on the throne of Alexander III, he moved with his family back to Vilna. There he worked in a law office and wrote clauses to the magazine Kraj in Polish. After dismissal of veins in Kushlyany (present-day Smarhon District), he died. He is buried in the village of Zhuprany in the Ashmyany District.

Works
Bahuševič was an initiator of critical realism in Belarusian literature. His works are closely connected with Belarusian folklore. He published two collections of poems, Dudka biełaruskaja and Smyk biełaruski, in Austria-Hungary. Bahuševič published his works under the pseudonyms Maciej Buračok, Symon Reŭka z-pad Barysava.

He wrote mainly in Belarusian. He started when he was still in Ukraine, but he took up literary activity only after returning to Vilnius. Two collections of poems and poems were published during his lifetime. They were published abroad: Dudka biełaruskaja (Kraków, 1891) and Smyk biełaruski (Poznań, 1896). After the fall of the uprising in Belarus, the printing of Belarusian books was forbidden until 1905, which is why his works were published illegally and spread in manuscripts.

Bahuszewicz's poetry is called a peasant poetry. He used the literary pseudonyms Maciej Buračok and Symon Reŭka z-pad Barysava (Symon Reuka from Barysaw). Maciej Buraczok was a resident of Kuszlan, and Symon Reŭka was from Barysaw. In this way, the pseudonyms covered the whole of Belarus. He was the first author of an all-Belarusian book of poetry and is considered the father of Belarusian realism, the creator of national romantic tendencies in Belarusian literature. He wrote the first short stories in the Belarusian literature (Traralonochka, published in a separate booklet in 1892), folk novellas (Świadek, Polesovszczik, Diadina, published after his death in the Nasha Niva newspaper in 1907). He also published in Polish and was a correspondent of the Polish magazine "Kraj". His letters to his friends, Eliza Orzeszkowa and Jan Karłowicz, have been preserved.

Gallery

References 

1840 births
1900 deaths
People from Vilnius District Municipality
People from Vilna Governorate
Belarusian male poets
January Uprising participants
19th-century Belarusian poets
19th-century male writers
Poets from the Russian Empire
Belarusian writers in Polish